Contactin-associated protein-like 4 is a protein that in humans is encoded by the CNTNAP4 gene.

This gene product belongs to the neurexin family, members of which function in the vertebrate nervous system as cell adhesion molecules and receptors. This protein, like other neurexin proteins, contains epidermal growth factor repeats and laminin G domains. In addition, it includes an F5/8 type C domain, discoidin/neuropilin- and fibrinogen-like domains, and thrombospondin N-terminal-like domains. Alternative splicing results in two transcript variants encoding different isoforms.

References

External links

Further reading